In the 1971 American Soccer League II, the New York Greeks were the champions. After the season, Virginia Capitol moved to Washington, and Syracuse folded.

League standings

References

American Soccer League (1933–1983) seasons
2